A radio orchestra (or broadcast orchestra) is an orchestra employed by a radio network (and sometimes television networks) in order to provide programming as well as sometimes perform incidental or theme music for various shows on the network. In the heyday of radio such orchestras were numerous, performing classical, popular, light music and jazz. However, in recent decades, broadcast orchestras have become increasingly rare. Those that still exist perform mainly classical and contemporary orchestral music, though broadcast light music orchestras, jazz orchestras and big bands are still employed by some radio stations in Europe.

Famous broadcast orchestras include the NBC Symphony Orchestra (1937–1954) conducted by Arturo Toscanini, the five orchestras maintained by the BBC, particularly the BBC Symphony Orchestra founded in 1930, the MDR Symphony Orchestra founded in 1923, the Bavarian Radio Symphony Orchestra founded in 1949, the Tokyo-based NHK Symphony Orchestra, the Danish National Symphony Orchestra founded in 1925, the Vienna Radio Symphony Orchestra founded in 1969 and the Tchaikovsky Symphony Orchestra of Moscow Radio (formerly the USSR State Radio and Television Symphony Orchestra among other names) founded in 1930.

Germany has an especially large number of radio orchestras. Twelve radio orchestras perform and produce classical as well as contemporary music and jazz for Germany's public broadcasters. North German Broadcasting (NDR) has two orchestras in Hamburg and Hanover as well as the NDR Big Band also in Hamburg. West German Broadcasting (WDR) has two orchestras in Cologne and a Big Band, Southwest German Broadcasting (SWR) with two orchestras and the SWR Big Band in Stuttgart and Baden-Baden/Freiburg, Bavarian Broadcasting (Bayerischer Rundfunk) with two orchestras in Munich, Central German Broadcasting (MDR) with one orchestra in Leipzig, Saarland Broadcasting (SR) with one (2006 merged) orchestra in Saarbrücken/Kaiserslautern, Hessian Broadcasting (HR) with one orchestra in Frankfurt and the (Berlin Radio Symphony Orchestra), Berlin.

The British Broadcasting Corporation operates five full-time permanent orchestras, as well as a full-time chamber choir, the BBC Singers and the BBC Big Band.

Denmark also maintains orchestra in the form of the Danish National Symphony Orchestra, the Danish Radio Big Band, Chamber Orchestra and Radio Choir.

In Norway NRK runs the Norwegian Radio Orchestra (Norwegian, Kringkastingsorkestret, abbreviated as KORK). The orchestra specializes in classical music as well as popular music. This makes it quite unique in that the musicians are trained 
both classically and rhythmically too a high degree. The Bergen Philharmonic Orchestra and Stavanger Symphony Orchestra also have agreements with NRK too make a number of broadcast recordings a year.

In the Netherlands, the Muziekcentrum van de Omroep (Broadcasting Music Centre), an umbrella organization of the Netherlands Public Broadcasting associations, supports the Radio Filharmonisch Orkest, the Radio Kamer Filharmonie, the Groot Omroepkoor (Netherlands Radio Choir), and the Metropole Orkest, the world's largest professional pop and jazz orchestra.

The last surviving broadcast orchestra in North America was the CBC Radio Orchestra founded in 1938. On March 28, 2008 the Canadian Broadcasting Corporation announced that the orchestra would be dissolved at the end of November. The ensemble has continued independent of network affiliation as the National Broadcast Orchestra based in Vancouver.

The Australian Broadcasting Corporation (ABC) in Australia operates six state radio symphony orchestras through its subdivision Symphony Australia.

The house band for the Late Show with David Letterman whimsically called itself the CBS Orchestra though it was not a classical musical orchestra and did not perform on CBS outside of the Late Show. The last permanent studio orchestra in America was The Tonight Show Band, also known as the NBC Orchestra, a big band led by trumpeter Doc Severinsen.

See also
List of radio orchestras

References

Orchestras